Loto is one of three villages on the island of Wale in the Pukapuka atoll of the Cook Islands. It is the central village and regulates Motu Uta, the major food-production area on Wale.

References

Pukapuka
Populated places in the Cook Islands